Juan Larrea (born 17 April 1935) is an Argentine fencer. He competed in the individual and team sabre events at the 1960 Summer Olympics.

References

1935 births
Living people
Argentine male fencers
Argentine sabre fencers
Olympic fencers of Argentina
Fencers at the 1960 Summer Olympics
Fencers from Buenos Aires